Muhammed Ishfakul Majid (17 March 1903 – 31 March 1976) was the first Bengali general in the Pakistan Army.

Personal
He was born on 17 March 1903 in Jorhat, Assam, British India. He is the son of Abdul Majid, the first Muslim who served as a Justice in the Bengal High Court. He completed his undergraduate in Cotton College, Guwahati, Assam. On 2 February 1922 he joined the Royal Military College, Sandhurst. He was the first Bengali Muslim to graduate from Sandhurst.

Military career (Indian Army)
Ishfakul Majid joined the Royal Military College, Sandhurst on 2 February 1922. He was commissioned on 27 August 1924 on the Unattached List for the Indian Army. After his commission, Ishfakul Majid was attached with the second battalion of Lincolnshire Regiment of the British Army for one year. On 31 October 1925 he was accepted for the British Indian Army, being posted to the 4th Battalion 19th Hyderabad Regiment. He was promoted Lieutenant 27 November 1926, Captain 27 August 1933 and Major 1 December 1941. He served in Burma and British Malaya during the Second World War attached to the Assam Regiment.

Military career (Pakistan Army)
In 1947, Majid joined the Pakistan Army. In Pakistan Army he was promoted to the rank of Major General. He became the GOC of the 9 Division of the Pakistan Army. Majid was senior to Ayub Khan but Ayub Khan became the Commander-in-Chief of Pakistan Army bypassing hm. Majid was named in the Rawalpindi conspiracy but later he was proved innocent.

Bangladesh
He returned to East Pakistan in 1962. Major General Majid and Colonel M. A. G. Osmani met with Sheikh Mujibur Rahman in March 1971 on behalf of retired Bengali soldiers and showed their loyalty towards an independent Bangladesh. Majid was later arrested by the Pakistan Army. He was tortured in custody.

Death 
He died on 31 March 1976 in Combined Military Hospital, Dhaka, Bangladesh.

Sources
 London Gazette (various dates)
 Indian Army List (various dates)
 The History Of The Assam Regiment Vol-I (Captain Peter Steyn)

References

British Indian Army officers
Pakistani generals
Graduates of the Royal Military College, Sandhurst
Bangladeshi military personnel
1903 births
1976 deaths